The Arai River or May River is a river in southern Papua New Guinea. Various Papuan languages are spoken in the watershed of the May River, including the Iwam language and the Arai–Samaia languages.

See also
List of rivers of Papua New Guinea
Arai–Samaia languages

References

Rivers of Papua New Guinea